Clotizolam (Ro11-1465) is a thienotriazolodiazepine derivative first invented in the 1970s, which in more recent years has been sold as a designer drug. As with other related thienotriazolodiazepines, it produces sedative, anxiolytic, anticonvulsant and muscle relaxant effects, and also acts as an inhibitor of platelet-activating factor (PAF).

See also
 Brotizolam
 Etizolam
 Flubrotizolam
 Fluclotizolam
 Deschloroclotizolam
 Ro09-9212
 Triazolam

References

Designer drugs
GABAA receptor positive allosteric modulators
Thienotriazolodiazepines
Chloroarenes
Phenyl compounds